Jens may refer to:

 Jens (given name), a list of people with the name
 Jens (surname), a list of people
 Jens, Switzerland, a municipality
 1719 Jens, an asteroid

See also 
 Jensen (disambiguation)
 Jenssi